Bowskill is a surname. Notable people with the surname include:

Brenda Bowskill (born 1992), Canadian sailor
Jimmy Bowskill (born 1990), Canadian musician